"Only Uh, Uh,..." is a song by German recording artist Juliette Schoppmann. It was written by Steve Lee, Pete Martin, and Tina Harris and recorded by Schoppmann for her debut studio album, Unique (2004). Production was helmed by Martin. Released in October 2003 as the album's second single, the uptempo electro pop song underperformed on the charts, peaking at number 60 on the German Singles Chart, becoming Uniques lowest-charting single.

Track listing

Charts

References

2003 singles
2003 songs
Songs written by Tina Harris